Sean O'Brien (born February 9, 1972) is an American former professional ice hockey left winger who played one season in the Finnish SM-liiga for Tappara.

Awards and honors

References

External links

1972 births
Anaheim Bullfrogs players
Canadian ice hockey left wingers
Houston Aeros (1994–2013) players
Las Vegas Thunder players
Living people
Ice hockey people from Boston
Philadelphia Phantoms players
Princeton Tigers men's ice hockey players
Richmond Renegades players
Syracuse Crunch players
Tallahassee Tiger Sharks players
Tappara players
Utah Grizzlies (IHL) players
Canadian expatriate ice hockey players in Finland
Canadian expatriate ice hockey players in the United States